Isobel Mary "Izzy" Christiansen (born 20 September 1991) is an English footballer who plays as a midfielder or forward for Everton in the FA WSL and the England national team.

Club career
Christiansen captained the women's football club at the University of Birmingham.

Christiansen has played in the UEFA Women's Champions League with Everton and also played for Birmingham City.

On 7 February 2014, Christiansen officially signed for new WSL club Manchester City Women. On 16 October 2014, she scored the only goal to help Manchester City defeat Arsenal Ladies and win the 2014 FA WSL Continental Cup. In April 2016, she won three awards, two of which were the PFA Women's Players' Player of the Year and PFA WSL Team of the Year. Upon winning the awards, Christiansen said: "I'm pretty shocked. Three awards is a great achievement and I'm so pleased to have been able to have done that for the team."

On 23 July 2018, Christiansen signed a contract with defending European Champions Olympique Lyon until 2020. In her first season with the club, Lyon won the treble: winning Division 1 Féminine, Coupe de France and Champions League.

On 27 December 2019, Christiansen announced her return to England, signing an 18-month deal with Everton. She made her debut, in the following season, in a 4–0 league win against Bristol City on 6 September 2020. A week later, Christiansen scored her first goal since returning in a 1–0 win against Tottenham Hotspur.

International career
As a junior international, she won the 2009 U-19 European Championship and a silver in the following year's edition, and played the 2008 U-17 and 2010 U-20 World Cups.

Christiansen helped Great Britain to win a gold medal in the 2013 Summer Universiade in Kazan, Russia. In January 2014, she was promoted from the under-23s into the senior England squad, to replace Jodie Taylor who had withdrawn.

Coach Mark Sampson gave Christiansen her senior international debut in a UEFA Women's Euro 2017 qualifying match against Estonia on 21 September 2015. She marked the occasion by scoring in England's 8–0 win.

In March 2019, Christiansen underwent surgery on an ankle injury sustained in England's 3–0 SheBelieves Cup win over Japan. England coach Phil Neville called her "vital" to his squad and hoped that her rehabilitation programme would restore her to fitness for the 2019 FIFA Women's World Cup.

International goals
England score listed first, score column indicates score after each Christiansen goal.

Personal life
In June 2020, Christiansen joined Common Goal, becoming the first Everton player to do so.

Formerly, Christiansen was in a relationship with fellow women's footballer Billie Murphy.

Honours
Birmingham City
FA Women's Cup: 2011–12

Manchester City
FA WSL Continental Cup: 2014, 2016
Women's Super League: 2016
Women's FA Cup: 2016–17

Olympique Lyonnais

Division 1 Féminine: 2018–19
Coupe de France: 2019
UEFA Women's Champions League: 2018–19
Trophée des Championnes: 2019

England
 SheBelieves Cup: 2019

Individual
PFA Women's Players' Player of the Year: 2015–16

References

External links

1991 births
Living people
English women's footballers
England women's international footballers
England women's under-23 international footballers
Women's Super League players
Everton F.C. (women) players
Birmingham City W.F.C. players
FA Women's National League players
Manchester City W.F.C. players
LGBT association football players
English LGBT sportspeople
Women's association football midfielders
Sportspeople from Macclesfield
Olympique Lyonnais Féminin players
Expatriate women's footballers in France
English expatriate sportspeople in France
Footballers from Cheshire
Division 1 Féminine players
Universiade gold medalists for Great Britain
Universiade medalists in football
UEFA Women's Euro 2017 players